Undzer emes ('Our Truth') was a Yiddish-language communist publication in interwar Lithuania, an organ of the Central Committee of the Communist Party of Lithuania. The publication was issued illegally and irregularly from Kaunas between 1923 and 1934. It was published clandestinely on a monthly basis, with a circulation of 3,000. Aizikas Lifšicas and J. Šochotas were part of the editorial team of Undzer emes.

Undzer emes was printed in Berlin 1931–1933, but the Lithuanian communists could not continue publishing activities there following the National Socialist takeover in Germany.

References

Ashkenazi Jewish culture in Berlin
Communism in Germany
Communism in Lithuania
Defunct newspapers published in Lithuania
Jews and Judaism in Berlin
Jews and Judaism in Kaunas
Publications established in 1923
Publications disestablished in 1934
Secular Jewish culture in Europe
Yiddish communist newspapers
Yiddish culture in Germany
Yiddish-language mass media in Lithuania
Monthly newspapers